Elder is a single-member electoral district for the South Australian House of Assembly. It is named after nineteenth-century businessman and philanthropist Sir Thomas Elder. Elder is an 18.3 km² suburban electorate in Adelaide's inner south, taking in the suburbs of Clapham, Clovelly Park, Colonel Light Gardens, Cumberland Park, Daw Park, Hawthorn, Lower Mitcham, Melrose Park, Mitchell Park, Panorama, Pasadena, St Marys, Tonsley, and Westbourne Park.

Elder was created as a marginal Labor electorate at the 1991 electoral redistribution taking suburbs in from much of the abolished Walsh and also from the redistributed Mitchell. Elder was won by Liberal David Wade with an 8.0 percent swing at the landslide Liberal victory of the 1993 election. Wade was defeated at the 1997 election – although he experienced a smaller than average swing of −6.1 percent, he only had a margin of 3.4 percent, and was easily defeated by Labor candidate Pat Conlon. Conlon was re-elected at the 2002 election and became a senior minister in the Rann government. The redistribution prior to the 2014 election reduced Labor's margin from 3.6 percent to 2.0 percent. Conlon retired in 2014 and Elder was retained by Labor's Annabel Digance.

The 2016 redistribution ahead of the 2018 election changed Elder from a 1.8 percent Labor seat to a notional 4.3 percent Liberal seat.

Members for Elder

Election results

Notes

References
 ECSA profile for Elder: 2018
 ABC profile for Elder: 2018
 Poll Bludger profile for Elder: 2018

Electoral districts of South Australia
1993 establishments in Australia